Anthonomini is a weevil tribe in the subfamily Curculioninae.

Genera 
 Acalyptops - Achia - Adelus - Anthonomopsis - Anthonomus - Apopnictus - Assuanensius - Atractomerus - Botanebius - Brachonyx - Brachyogmus - Bradybatus - Chelonychus - Cionesthes - Cionomimus - Cionopsis - Coccotorus - Cremastorhynchus - Dietzianus - Ephelops - Epimechus - Huaca - Lepidoops - Lonchophorellus - Loncophorus - Macrobrachonyx - Magdalinops - Melexeras - Nanops - Narberdia - Neomastix - Neosphinctocraerus - Omogonus - Onychoenemis - Parendoeopsis - Phacellopterus - Pseudanthonomus - Pseudopoophagus - Smicraulax - Sphincticraerus - Synnadophila - Telphasia

References

External links 

Curculioninae
Beetle tribes